Manuel Sánchez or Sanchez may refer to:

 Manolo (footballer, born 1965) (Manuel Sánchez Delgado), Spanish footballer
 Manuel Sánchez (economist) (born 1950), Mexican economist
 Manuel Sánchez (tennis) (born 1991), Mexican tennis player
 Manuel Sánchez López (weightlifter) (born 1991), Spanish weightlifter
 Manuel Sánchez López (born 1988), Spanish footballer for AD Alcorcón
 Manuel Sánchez Torres (born 1960), Spanish footballer
 Manuel Sanchez, member of the American 2000s band, Flee the Seen 
 Manu Sánchez (footballer, born 1979), Spanish footballer
 Manu Sánchez (footballer, born 2000), Spanish footballer